Beautiful Trio (大女人·小女人) is a Chinese language drama broadcast on Singapore's largest television network, MediaCorp TV Channel 8. The show was filmed in 2003 but broadcast in 2004. It stars Huang Biren , Ivy Lee , Stella Huang & Zhang Yaodong as the casts of the series.

This series was re-telecasted on MediaCorp TV Channel 8 on every Saturday, 11am to 1pm and has since ended its re-run on 31 January 2009.

Synopsis
The drama revolves mainly around three women with different ways of dealing with a relationship and their views of men.

Huang Biren plays Christina, a 40-year-old woman with a 14-year-old daughter whose husband (played by Li Wen Hai) is a houseman.

Ivy Lee plays Leo Leo, a 33-year-old women who thinks that men are only interested in sex.

Stella Ng plays Samantha, a 24-year-old who thinks that men cannot protect her. Because of the same thinking about detesting men in the three women, they become very good friends. Zzen Chang acts as Stella Ng's good buddy in the show, the only man that she trusts.

Cast

Main cast
 Huang Biren as Christina
 Ivy Lee as Leo Leo
 Stella Huang as Samantha

Supporting Cast
 Zhang Yaodong
 Zen Chong
 Li Wenhai
 Benjamin Yeung Sheung Bun (Hong Kong singer)

References

External links 
 Mediacorp TV Contains character summaries.

2004 Singaporean television series debuts
2004 Singaporean television series endings
Singapore Chinese dramas
Channel 8 (Singapore) original programming